Argyle Street Camp was a Japanese World War II prisoner-of-war camp in Kowloon, Hong Kong, which primarily held officer prisoners.

World War II
Built by the Hong Kong government as a refugee camp before the war as North Point Camp and Ma Tau Chung Camp, it began life as a POW camp soon after Kowloon and the New Territories were abandoned to the Japanese.

In January 1942 it was emptied, with the POWs moving to Shamshuipo, North Point, and Ma Tau Chung Camps. However, after a number of escapes by POW officers and other ranks from Shamshuipo, Argyle Street was re-opened in mid-1942 as an officers' camp. In 1944 the officers were moved instead to Camp 'N' at Shamshuipo, and the Indian POWs from Ma Tau Chung Camp took up residence.

After World War II
After the Japanese surrender, Argyle Street Camp became a centre for displaced people returning to Hong Kong. Later still, it was a camp for refugees reaching Hong Kong from other parts of South East Asia. The camp started accommodating Vietnamese refugees in June 1979, with a planned capacity of 20,000.

Today there are no memorials of any kind on the site of the camp, which is just to the south of St Teresa's Hospital.

See also
Japanese occupation of Hong Kong
List of Japanese-run internment camps during World War II
Second Sino-Japanese War
Argyle Street, Hong Kong
Stanley Internment Camp

References

Further reading

Japanese occupation of Hong Kong
Kowloon City District
Japanese prisoner of war and internment camps